The Markaziy Harbiy Sportklubi Army Stadium, commonly known as the MHSK Stadium was a multi-use stadium in the Chilanzar area of Tashkent, Uzbekistan. It was used mostly for football matches and was the home stadium of FC Bunyodkor.

History

The stadium was built in 1986, and initially held 21,000. Reconstruction during 2007-08 reduced the capacity to 16,000. Stadium was completely demolished in 2008–2009. At the place of stadium was built new venue, Bunyodkor Stadium and football academy.

External links

Stadium information FC Bunyodkor

Football venues in Uzbekistan